The Clan was a collective name for a group of Motown composers which consisted of R. Dean Taylor, Frank Wilson, Pam Sawyer and Deke Richards assembled in late 1967 to replace the songwriting trio of Holland–Dozier–Holland. The group's first effort was "Love Child", a US #1 single for Diana Ross and the Supremes in the fall of 1968, followed by "I'm Livin' in Shame" the following year. They disbanded in 1969 and themselves were replaced by another hit-making songwriting team known as The Corporation (which also contained Deke Richards), who went on to produce The Jackson 5.

American songwriters
Songwriting teams
Motown artists